Çatalsu may refer:

 Çatalsu, Gülağaç, a village in Aksaray Province in Turkey
 Çatalsu, Oğuzeli, a village in Gaziantep Province in Turkey